Orestas Buitkus (born 11 April 1975) is a Lithuanian former professional footballer. A midfielder, he stands 1.76 m tall and weighs 74 kg.

As of May 2006 Buitkus has scored 6 goals in 29 appearances for the Lithuanian national team. He has previously played for Rubin Kazan, Skonto Riga, Baltika Kaliningrad, FBK Kaunas and Banga Gargždai. He last played for FK Tauras Tauragė.

External links
 

1975 births
Living people
Lithuanian footballers
Lithuanian expatriate footballers
Lithuania international footballers
FC Rubin Kazan players
FC Baltika Kaliningrad players
Skonto FC players
Russian Premier League players
Sportspeople from Klaipėda
Expatriate footballers in Russia
Association football midfielders